This is a list of Cryptocarya species, trees in the Lauraceae family. The list follows Plants of the World Online, which recognised 357 accepted species .

Gallery 1

Species

Cryptocarya acuminata 
Cryptocarya acutifolia 
Cryptocarya adpressa 
Cryptocarya agathophylla 
Cryptocarya ainikinii 
Cryptocarya alba 
Cryptocarya albifrons 
Cryptocarya alleniana 
Cryptocarya alseodaphnifolia 
Cryptocarya alticola 
Cryptocarya ambrensis 
Cryptocarya ampla 
Cryptocarya amygdalina 
Cryptocarya anamalayana 
Cryptocarya andamanica 
Cryptocarya angica 
Cryptocarya angulata 
Cryptocarya angustifolia 
Cryptocarya apamifolia 
Cryptocarya archboldiana 
Cryptocarya arfakensis 
Cryptocarya argyrophylla 
Cryptocarya aristata 
Cryptocarya aschersoniana 
Cryptocarya atra 
Cryptocarya aurea 
Cryptocarya aureobrunnea 
Cryptocarya aureosericea 
Cryptocarya austrokweichouensis 
Cryptocarya balakrishnanii 
Cryptocarya bamagana 
Cryptocarya barbellata 
Cryptocarya barrabeae 
Cryptocarya beddomei 
Cryptocarya beilschmiediifolia 
Cryptocarya bellendenkerana 
Cryptocarya bernhardiensis 
Cryptocarya bhutanica 
Cryptocarya bidwillii 
Cryptocarya biswasii 
Cryptocarya bitriplinervia 
Cryptocarya boemiensis 
Cryptocarya botelhensis 
Cryptocarya brachythyrsa 
Cryptocarya bracteolata 
Cryptocarya brassii 
Cryptocarya brevipes 
Cryptocarya bullata 
Cryptocarya burckeana 
Cryptocarya caesia 
Cryptocarya cagayanensis 
Cryptocarya calandoi 
Cryptocarya calcicola 
Cryptocarya calderi 
Cryptocarya calelanensis 
Cryptocarya caloneura 
Cryptocarya canaliculata 
Cryptocarya capuronii 
Cryptocarya carrii 
Cryptocarya caryoptera 
Cryptocarya cavei 
Cryptocarya celebica 
Cryptocarya ceramica 
Cryptocarya cercophylla 
Cryptocarya chanthaburiensis 
Cryptocarya chartacea 
Cryptocarya chinensis 
Cryptocarya chingii 
Cryptocarya chrysea 
Cryptocarya citriformis 
Cryptocarya clarksoniana 
Cryptocarya claudiana 
Cryptocarya cocosoides 
Cryptocarya concinna 
Cryptocarya constricta 
Cryptocarya cordata 
Cryptocarya cordifolia 
Cryptocarya coriacea 
Cryptocarya corrugata 
Cryptocarya costata 
Cryptocarya crassifolia 
Cryptocarya crassinerviopsis 
Cryptocarya cunninghamii 
Cryptocarya cuprea 
Cryptocarya darusensis 
Cryptocarya dealbata 
Cryptocarya dekae 
Cryptocarya densiflora 
Cryptocarya depauperata 
Cryptocarya depressa 
Cryptocarya dipterocarpifolia 
Cryptocarya diversifolia 
Cryptocarya dorrigoensis 
Cryptocarya durifolia 
Cryptocarya edanoii 
Cryptocarya elegans 
Cryptocarya elliptica 
Cryptocarya elliptifolia 
Cryptocarya elongata 
Cryptocarya endiandrifolia 
Cryptocarya enervis 
Cryptocarya engleriana 
Cryptocarya erythroxylon 
Cryptocarya euphlebia 
Cryptocarya everettii 
Cryptocarya exfoliata 
Cryptocarya fagifolia 
Cryptocarya ferrarsi 
Cryptocarya ferrea 
Cryptocarya filicifolia 
Cryptocarya flavescens 
Cryptocarya flavisperma 
Cryptocarya floydii 
Cryptocarya fluminensis 
Cryptocarya foetida 
Cryptocarya forbesii 
Cryptocarya foveolata 
Cryptocarya foxworthyi 
Cryptocarya fulva 
Cryptocarya fusca 
Cryptocarya fuscopilosa 
Cryptocarya gigantocarpa 
Cryptocarya glabriflora 
Cryptocarya glauca 
Cryptocarya glaucescens 
Cryptocarya glauciphylla 
Cryptocarya glaucocarpa 
Cryptocarya globosa 
Cryptocarya globularia 
Cryptocarya gonioclada 
Cryptocarya gracilis 
Cryptocarya graehneriana 
Cryptocarya grandis 
Cryptocarya gregsonii 
Cryptocarya griffithiana 
Cryptocarya guianensis 
Cryptocarya guillauminii 
Cryptocarya hainanensis 
Cryptocarya hartleyi 
Cryptocarya helicina 
Cryptocarya hornei 
Cryptocarya hypospodia 
Cryptocarya idenburgensis 
Cryptocarya ilocana 
Cryptocarya impressa 
Cryptocarya impressivena 
Cryptocarya insularis 
Cryptocarya intermedia 
Cryptocarya invasiorum 
Cryptocarya iridescens 
Cryptocarya jacarepaguensis 
Cryptocarya kajewskii 
Cryptocarya kamahar 
Cryptocarya krameri 
Cryptocarya kurzii 
Cryptocarya kwangtungensis 
Cryptocarya laevigata 
Cryptocarya lanceolata 
Cryptocarya lancifolia 
Cryptocarya lancilimba 
Cryptocarya lanuginosa 
Cryptocarya laotica 
Cryptocarya latifolia 
Cryptocarya lauriflora 
Cryptocarya lawsonii 
Cryptocarya ledermannii 
Cryptocarya leiana 
Cryptocarya leptospermoides 
Cryptocarya leucophylla 
Cryptocarya liebertiana 
Cryptocarya lifuensis 
Cryptocarya litoralis 
Cryptocarya lividula 
Cryptocarya loheri 
Cryptocarya longepetiolata 
Cryptocarya longifolia 
Cryptocarya loureirii 
Cryptocarya louvelii 
Cryptocarya lucida 
Cryptocarya lyoniifolia 
Cryptocarya macdonaldii 
Cryptocarya mackeei 
Cryptocarya mackinnoniana 
Cryptocarya maclurei 
Cryptocarya macrocarpa 
Cryptocarya macrodesme 
Cryptocarya macrophylla 
Cryptocarya maculata 
Cryptocarya magnifolia 
Cryptocarya malayana 
Cryptocarya mandioccana 
Cryptocarya mannii 
Cryptocarya massoy 
Cryptocarya medicinalis 
Cryptocarya megaphylla 
Cryptocarya meisneriana 
Cryptocarya melanocarpa 
Cryptocarya membranacea 
Cryptocarya metcalfiana 
Cryptocarya micrantha 
Cryptocarya microcos 
Cryptocarya microneura 
Cryptocarya mindanaensis 
Cryptocarya minutifolia 
Cryptocarya montana 
Cryptocarya moschata 
Cryptocarya multiflora 
Cryptocarya multinervis 
Cryptocarya multipaniculata 
Cryptocarya murrayi 
Cryptocarya myrcioides 
Cryptocarya myristicoides 
Cryptocarya myrtifolia 
Cryptocarya nana 
Cryptocarya natalensis 
Cryptocarya nigra 
Cryptocarya nitens 
Cryptocarya nothofagetorum 
Cryptocarya nova-anglica 
Cryptocarya oblata 
Cryptocarya obliqua 
Cryptocarya oblonga 
Cryptocarya oblongata 
Cryptocarya obovata 
Cryptocarya obtusifolia 
Cryptocarya occidentalis 
Cryptocarya ocoteifolia 
Cryptocarya odorata 
Cryptocarya oligocarpa 
Cryptocarya oligophlebia 
Cryptocarya onoprienkoana 
Cryptocarya oubatchensis 
Cryptocarya ovalifolia 
Cryptocarya ovata 
Cryptocarya ovatocaudata 
Cryptocarya pachyphylla 
Cryptocarya palawanensis 
Cryptocarya pallens 
Cryptocarya pallida 
Cryptocarya pallidifolia 
Cryptocarya palmerensis 
Cryptocarya panamensis 
Cryptocarya parallelinervia 
Cryptocarya parinarifolia 
Cryptocarya parinarioides 
Cryptocarya parvifolia 
Cryptocarya pauciflora 
Cryptocarya perareolata 
Cryptocarya pergamentacea 
Cryptocarya pergracilis 
Cryptocarya perlucida 
Cryptocarya pervillei 
Cryptocarya petiolata 
Cryptocarya phyllostemon 
Cryptocarya pleurosperma 
Cryptocarya pluricostata 
Cryptocarya polyneura 
Cryptocarya praetervisa 
Cryptocarya procera 
Cryptocarya pulchella 
Cryptocarya pulchrinervia 
Cryptocarya pullenii 
Cryptocarya pusilla 
Cryptocarya pustulata 
Cryptocarya putida 
Cryptocarya ramosii 
Cryptocarya rarinervia 
Cryptocarya renicarpa 
Cryptocarya resinosa 
Cryptocarya reticulata 
Cryptocarya retusa 
Cryptocarya revoluta 
Cryptocarya rhizophoretum 
Cryptocarya rhodosperma 
Cryptocarya riedeliana 
Cryptocarya rifaii 
Cryptocarya rigida 
Cryptocarya rigidifolia 
Cryptocarya robynsiana 
Cryptocarya roemeri 
Cryptocarya rotundifolia 
Cryptocarya rubiginosa 
Cryptocarya rubra 
Cryptocarya rugulosa 
Cryptocarya ruruvaiensis 
Cryptocarya saccharata 
Cryptocarya saligna 
Cryptocarya samarensis 
Cryptocarya samoensis 
Cryptocarya schlechteri 
Cryptocarya schmidii 
Cryptocarya schoddei 
Cryptocarya sclerophylla 
Cryptocarya sellowiana 
Cryptocarya septentrionalis 
Cryptocarya sericeotriplinervia 
Cryptocarya simonsii 
Cryptocarya sleumeri 
Cryptocarya smaragdina 
Cryptocarya spathulata 
Cryptocarya splendens 
Cryptocarya stocksii 
Cryptocarya strictifolia 
Cryptocarya subbullata 
Cryptocarya subfalcata 
Cryptocarya sublanuginosa 
Cryptocarya subtrinervis 
Cryptocarya subtriplinervia 
Cryptocarya subvelutina 
Cryptocarya sulavesiana 
Cryptocarya sulcata 
Cryptocarya sumatrana 
Cryptocarya sumbawaensis 
Cryptocarya tannaensis 
Cryptocarya tawaensis 
Cryptocarya tebaensis 
Cryptocarya tesselata 
Cryptocarya tetragona 
Cryptocarya teysmanniana 
Cryptocarya thouvenotii 
Cryptocarya todayensis 
Cryptocarya transvaalensis 
Cryptocarya transversa 
Cryptocarya triplinervis 
Cryptocarya tsangii 
Cryptocarya tuanku-bujangii 
Cryptocarya turbinata 
Cryptocarya turrilliana 
Cryptocarya umbonata 
Cryptocarya vacciniifolia 
Cryptocarya vanderwerffii 
Cryptocarya velloziana 
Cryptocarya velutina 
Cryptocarya velutinosa 
Cryptocarya verrucosa 
Cryptocarya vidalii 
Cryptocarya villarii 
Cryptocarya viridiflora 
Cryptocarya vulgaris 
Cryptocarya weinlandii 
Cryptocarya whiffiniana 
Cryptocarya whiteana 
Cryptocarya wiedensis 
Cryptocarya wightiana 
Cryptocarya wilderiana 
Cryptocarya williwilliana 
Cryptocarya wilsonii 
Cryptocarya womersleyi 
Cryptocarya woodii 
Cryptocarya wrayi 
Cryptocarya wyliei 
Cryptocarya xylophylla 
Cryptocarya yaanica 
Cryptocarya yasuniensis 
Cryptocarya yunnanensis 
Cryptocarya zamboangensis 
Cryptocarya zollingeriana

Gallery 2

References

List
Cryptocarya